Kiatnakin Phatra Bank is a full-service bank based in Thailand.  The bank was founded in January 1971 in Bangkok with 17,000 million baht in funds, and has grown to 52 branches. It was listed on the Stock Exchange of Thailand in August 1988 and is included in the  SET50 Index.  The company headquarters is in Bangkok.

History
Kiatnakin was founded in 1971 as a financial services company, and grew steadily until the recession of the late-1990s forced a suspension of operations. In 2005 the bank, which at the time had 22 financial service branches, applied for and received a commercial banking license.

In December 2011, Kiatnakin Bank and Phatra Capital amalgamated to form a new organization with a $1 billion valuation.

Subsidiaries
Kiatnakin Securities is a subsidiary company of the bank, and in 2008 the company established a new wholly owned subsidiary, Erawan Law Office.

See also

 Banking in Thailand

References

External links
Kiatnakin Bank official site
Google finance, Kiatnakin Bank
Bloomberg, Kiatnakin Bank

Banks of Thailand
Companies based in Bangkok
Banks established in 1971
Companies listed on the Stock Exchange of Thailand
Thai companies established in 1971